Fearless is the second album by the English actor/singer Tim Curry. Released in 1979, it was his most commercially successful album, reaching #53 on the U.S. Billboard 200 album chart.

Unlike his first album which consisted of cover versions, Fearless was composed almost entirely of original songs, mostly written by Curry with producers Michael Kamen and former Lou Reed collaborator Dick Wagner.

A single, "I Do the Rock", became Curry's most successful in the United States, reaching the Billboard Hot 100. "Paradise Garage" was also released as a 7" and 12" single in certain countries.

"No Love on the Street" was later covered by Joe Bonamassa on his 2011 album Dust Bowl.

Track listing
 "Right on the Money" (Tim Curry, Dick Wagner) - 3:15
 "Hide This Face" (Tim Curry, Dick Wagner) - 2:56
 "I Do The Rock" (Tim Curry, Michael Kamen) - 4:45
 "S.O.S." (Dick Wagner) - 4:15
 "Cold Blue Steel and Sweet Fire" - (Joni Mitchell) - 3:37
 "Paradise Garage" (Tim Curry, Dick Wagner, Bob Babbitt, Charlie Collins) - 6:13
 "No Love on the Street" (Tim Curry, Michael Kamen) - 4:53
 "Something Short of Paradise" (Dick Wagner) - 3:20
 "Charge It" (Tim Curry, Dick Wagner) - 5:17

A 2017 remastered re-release of the album on CD includes the following bonus tracks, after the original nine.
 "Paradise Garage (Single Edit)" (Tim Curry, Dick Wagner, Bob Babbitt, Charlie Collins) - 4:05
 "Charge It (Single Edit)" (Tim Curry, Dick Wagner) - 3:59
 "I Do the Rock (High Fidelity Mix)" (Tim Curry, Michael Kamen) - 4:41
 "Sloe Gin" (Bob Ezrin, Michael Kamen) - 6:08

Personnel
Tim Curry - vocals
Dick Wagner - guitar
Bob Babbitt - bass
Charles Collins - drums, percussion
Michael Kamen - keyboards, oboe
Bette Sussman - keyboards
Michael Tschudin - synthesizer
Jimmy Maelen, Allan Schwartzberg - percussion
David Sanborn - alto saxophone
Arnold McCuller, David Lasley, Ula Hedwig - backing vocals

Chart positions
Album – Billboard (United States)

Singles – Billboard (United States)

See also
 Paradise Garage

References

External links
 Entry at discogs.com

1979 albums
Tim Curry albums
A&M Records albums
Albums produced by Michael Kamen